Rockhill or Rockhill Furnace is a borough in Huntingdon County, Pennsylvania, United States. The population was 371 at the 2010 census, down from 414 at the 2000 census. It is the site of the East Broad Top Railroad and the Rockhill Trolley Museum.

Although the community was long known as "Rockhill Furnace", its name has always officially been "Rockhill".

Geography
Rockhill is located in southern Huntingdon County at  (40.242927, -77.900433). It sits on the southwestern side of Blacklog Creek, across from its neighbor, the borough of Orbisonia. It is bordered to the west by  Saddle Back Ridge. Pennsylvania Route 994 passes through Rockhill, ending to the north in Orbisonia at U.S. Route 522 and leading southwest  to Three Springs.

Demographics

As of the census of 2000, there were 414 people, 173 households, and 119 families residing in the borough. The racial makeup of the borough was 99.28% White, 0.72% from other races. Hispanic or Latino of any race were 2.42% of the population.

There were 173 households, out of which 27.7% had children under the age of 18 living with them, 55.5% were married couples living together, 10.4% had a female householder with no husband present, and 31.2% were non-families. 27.2% of all households were made up of individuals, and 13.3% had someone living alone who was 65 years of age or older. The average household size was 2.39 and the average family size was 2.90.

In the borough the population was spread out, with 23.7% under the age of 18, 6.0% from 18 to 24, 28.7% from 25 to 44, 23.7% from 45 to 64, and 17.9% who were 65 years of age or older. The median age was 41 years. For every 100 females there were 84.8 males. For every 100 females age 18 and over, there were 82.7 males.

The median income for a household in the borough was $27,639, and the median income for a family was $36,250. Males had a median income of $31,125 versus $20,375 for females. The per capita income for the borough was $15,376. About 9.4% of families and 13.8% of the population were below the poverty line, including 14.0% of those under age 18 and 21.3% of those age 65 or over.

History

The narrow-gauge East Broad Top Railroad was constructed through the community in 1873. Rockhill was selected as the location of the railroad's maintenance facility. The parent company Rockhill Iron and Coal located their dual-stack coke-fired iron furnace here. Rockhill as it exists today was created by the coal company and the railroad as a support community for their infrastructure.

The iron furnace shut down for the last time in 1907, and the railroad became the primary employer. The EBT shut down in 1956, but a portion from Rockhill north to Shirleysburg was reactivated in 1960 as a tourist operation. In the late 2000s the track to the south was rehabilitated to PA 475 sufficiently for speeders to operate and give rides to the public.

Friends of the East Broad Top, Inc. have been working to provide rehabilitation to the facilities in Rockhill. Tours inside the East Broad Top shop complex are offered during the summer months.

Points of interest
 Rockhill Trolley Museum
 East Broad Top Railroad

References

External links
 Friends of the East Broad Top, Inc.

Populated places established in 1874
Boroughs in Huntingdon County, Pennsylvania
1874 establishments in Pennsylvania